Harry Karl Kurt Eduard, Count von Arnim-Suckow (3 October 1824 – 19 May 1881) was a German diplomat.

Early life
He was born at the Moitzelfitz estate in Pomerania, a son of Christian Ernst von Arnim zu Suckow and Friederike Auguste Elisabeth von Blankenburg. He was raised up by his uncle Heinrich von Arnim, who was Prussian ambassador at Paris and foreign minister in March 1848, while Count Arnim-Boytzenburg, whose daughter Harry von Arnim afterwards married, was Minister President.

Harry von Arnim studied law and entered the diplomatic service.

Career
After serving in some other posts, he was appointed ambassador to the Pope in 1864, and during the First Vatican Council (1869-1870), as ambassador of the North German Confederation, supported the German bishops who opposed the dogma of papal infallibility. He was made a count in 1870 and, during the next year, took a prominent part in the negotiations preceding the Treaty of Frankfort.

Due to his success in the treaty negotiations, he received an appointment as ambassador to France in 1872, a post of great difficulty and responsibility. Differences soon arose between him and Chancellor Otto von Bismarck: Arnim wished to support the monarchical party that was trying to overthrow Adolphe Thiers, but Bismarck ordered him to stand aloof from all French parties. Although Arnim did not give the implicit obedience to his instructions that Bismarck required, Bismarck found himself unable to recall him because of the great influence that Arnim enjoyed at court and the confidence that the Kaiser placed in him. He was looked upon by the Conservative Party, which were trying to overthrow Bismarck, as his successor, and it is said that he was closely connected with the court intrigues against the Chancellor.

In 1874, Bismarck secured Armin's transfer to Constantinople, but that appointment was immediately revoked. A Vienna newspaper published some correspondence on the Vatican Council, including confidential dispatches of Arnim, with the object of showing that he had demonstrated greater foresight than Bismarck. It was then found that a considerable number of papers were missing from the Paris embassy, and on 4 October, Arnim was arrested on the charge of embezzling state papers. That recourse to the criminal law against a man of his rank, who had held one of the most important diplomatic posts, caused great astonishment. His defense was that the papers were not official, and he was acquitted on the charge of embezzlement but convicted of undue delay in restoring official papers and condemned to three months' imprisonment. On appeal, the sentence was increased to nine months.

Arnim escaped punishment by remaining outside of the German Empire, chiefly in Austria. In 1875, he anonymously published the pamphlet "Pro nihilo" in Zurich, in which he attempted to show that the attack on him had been caused by Bismarck's personal jealousy. For that, he was accused of treason, insult to the emperor and libelling Bismarck and, in his absence, condemned to five years' penal servitude. From his exile in Austria, he published two more pamphlets on the ecclesiastical policy of Prussia, "Der Nunzius kommt!" (Vienna, 1878) and "Quid faciamus nos?" (Vienna, 1879). He made repeated attempts, which were supported by his family, to be allowed to return to Germany to take his trial afresh on the charge of treason. His request had just been granted when he died in Nice, France.

Legacy
In 1876, Bismarck carried an amendment to the criminal code to make it an offence punishable with imprisonment or a fine up to the equivalent of £250 for an official of the Foreign Office to communicate to others official documents or for an envoy to act contrary to his instructions. The clauses were commonly spoken of in Germany as the "Arnim paragraphs".

Personal life
Luise Elisabeth von Prillwitz (1827–1854), a daughter of Auguste von Prillwitz. Before her death in 1854, they were the parents of:

 Henning August von Arnim-Schlagenthin (1851–1910), who married Princess Anna of Toerring-Jettenbach in 1888. After her death, he married Elizabeth Beauchamp in 1891. After his death, she married Frank Russell, 2nd Earl Russell.
 Johannes von Arnim (1854–1880), who died unmarried.

After Luise' death, Harry was married to Sophie von Arnim (1836–1918), a daughter of Adolf Heinrich von Arnim-Boitzenburg and Anna Caroline von der Schulenburg. They were the parents of:

 Margarete von Arnim (1859–1940), who married Johann Friedrich Bernd von Arnim.
 Caroline von Arnim (1865–1898), who married Clemens Adolf von Einsiedel.
 Elise "Elly" Adolfine von Arnim

Count von Arnim died in Nice, France on 19 May 1881.

Honours
He received the following orders and decorations:

References

Attribution

External links

Graf Harry von Arnim at Oxford Reference

1824 births
1881 deaths
Ambassadors of Germany to France
Harry
Officiers of the Légion d'honneur
Grand Crosses of the Order of Christ (Portugal)